Moebius, Möbius or Mobius may refer to:

People
 August Ferdinand Möbius (1790–1868), German mathematician and astronomer
 Theodor Möbius (1821–1890), German philologist
 Karl Möbius (1825–1908), German zoologist and ecologist
 Paul Julius Möbius (1853–1907), German neurologist
 Dieter Moebius (1944–2015), German/Swiss musician
 Mark Mobius (born 1936), emerging markets investments pioneer
 Jean Giraud (1938–2012), French comics artist who used the pseudonym Mœbius

Fictional characters
 Mobius M. Mobius, a character in Marvel Comics
 Mobius, also known as the Anti-Monitor, a supervillain in DC Comics

Mathematics
 Möbius energy, a particular knot energy
 Möbius strip, an object with one surface and one edge
 Möbius function, an important multiplicative function in number theory and combinatorics
 Möbius transform, transform involving the Möbius function
 Möbius inversion formula, in number theory
 Möbius transformation, a particular rational function in geometry and complex analysis
 Möbius configuration, in geometry, a certain configuration in Euclidean space or projective space, consisting of two mutually inscribed tetrahedra
 Möbius–Kantor configuration, in geometry, a configuration consisting of eight points and eight lines, with three points on each line and three lines through each point
 Möbius–Kantor graph, in graph theory, a symmetric bipartite cubic graph with 16 vertices and 24 edges
 Möbius plane, a particular kind of plane geometry, built upon some affine planes by adding one point
 Möbius ladder, a cubic circulant graph

Video games 
 Moebius: The Orb of Celestial Harmony (1985)
 Moebius: Empire Rising (2014)
 Mobius Final Fantasy (2015)

Characters 
 Moebius, the main antagonistic faction of Xenoblade Chronicles 3
 Mobius, or Dr. Ignato Mobius, a character in the Command & Conquer series
 Moebius the Timestreamer, a character in the Legacy of Kain series
 Mobius 1, the call sign of the main character of Ace Combat 04: Shattered Skies
 Moebius Foundation and its military wing Moebius Corps, a faction in Starcraft II
 Mobius, the main antagonist of the Old World Blues DLC of Fallout: New Vegas
 Mobius, an Earth-like planet and setting of several Sonic the Hedgehog adaptations, such as Adventures of Sonic the Hedgehog, Sonic the Hedgehog (TV series), and the Archie Comics adaptation
 Mobius, the main antagonist organization from The Evil Within series
 Mobius, a character from the game Honkai Impact 3rd

Companies 
 Mobius Digital, the developer of Outer Wilds
 Rockstar Leeds, formerly known as Möbius Entertainment

Music
 Mobius Band, an American electronic rock trio
 Mobius, a 1975 album by pianist Cedar Walton
 "The Moebius", a song by Orbital on Orbital

Science and technology
 Möbius aromaticity, a special type of aromaticity found in some organic molecules
 Möbius benzene, also known as trans-benzene, an isomer of benzene demonstrating Möbius aromaticity
 Möbius (crater), a lunar crater
 Möbius–Hückel concept, one of two predicting reaction allowedness versus forbiddenness
 Mobius Science Center, a planned science museum in Spokane, Washington, United States
 Möbius syndrome, or Moebius, a rare congenital disorder resulting in facial paralysis
 Möbius resistor, in electronics

Television and film
 "Moebius" (Stargate SG-1), a 2005 two-part episode of the science fiction TV series Stargate SG-1
 Silent Möbius, a 1991 series of manga, anime, and film
 Ultraman Mebius, a Japanese television series, and the titular superhero
 Moebius (1996 film), an Argentine film
 Moebius (2013 film), a South Korean film
 Möbius (film), a Russian-French 2013 film with Jean Dujardin

Other uses
 Mobius Artists Group, international group of experimental artists
 Mevius, a derivative of the name Möbius used as a brand name for Japanese cigarettes 
 Möbius, one of the three physicists in the play The Physicists by Friedrich Dürrenmatt
 MOBIUS, a library consortium in Missouri, United States
 Mobius Loop roller coaster
 Moebius Models, a company that makes plastic scale models.
 Mobius Motors, a Kenyan car manufacturer
 Moebius Syndrome Foundation, a charitable foundation committed to raising awareness and support for those who have the rare congenital disorder Mobius Syndrome.
 Moebius, a gang in the Tokyo Revengers manga

See also
 Morbius (disambiguation)

German-language surnames
Surnames from given names